Havoc is a 1972 West German drama film directed by Peter Fleischmann. It was entered into the 1972 Cannes Film Festival.

Cast
 Vitus Zeplichal – Hille
 Reinhard Kolldehoff – Pfarrer
 Silke Kulik – Dimuth
 Helga Riedel-Hassenstein – Mutter
 Ingmar Zeisberg – Sibylle
 Werner Hess – Dr. Raucheisen
 Christoph Geraths – Drogist
 Ulrich Greiwe – Student
 Frédérique Jeantet – Roswitha
 Gabi Will – Gabi
 Eugen Pletsch – Schüler
 Kurt Wörtz – Schüler
 Bernhard Kimmel – Deserteur
 Ludwig Beyer – Alter Waldhornspieler
 Rex Aquam Aquarillo – Rentner

References

External links

1972 films
1972 drama films
German drama films
West German films
1970s German-language films
Films directed by Peter Fleischmann
1970s German films